Henry Palmer may refer to:

Politicians
Henry Palmer (Leicester MP) represented Leicester (UK Parliament constituency)
Henry Palmer (by 1496-1559), Member of Parliament for Bramber
Henry L. Palmer (1819–1909), Wisconsin politician
Henry Wilbur Palmer (1839–1913), member of the U.S. House of Representatives from Pennsylvania
Henry Palmer (Australian politician) (1821–1916), member of the Queensland Legislative Assembly
Henry Wyndham Palmer (1826–1887), member of the Queensland Legislative Assembly

Other people
Henry Palmer (Royal Navy officer, died 1611) (1550–1611), Surveyor of the Navy from 1589 to 1598
Henry Palmer (Royal Navy officer, born 1582) (1582–1644), Royal Navy officer
Henry Palmer (surgeon) (1827–1895), Union Army surgeon
Henry Robinson Palmer (1795–1844), English engineer, in 1824 produced designs for a horse-drawn suspended monorail
Henry Spencer Palmer (1838–1893), British army military engineer and surveyor
Henry Palmer (priest) (1741–1801), Anglican priest

See also
Harry Palmer (disambiguation)